The Ashley River is a river in South Carolina in the United States. 

Ashley River may also refer to: 

 Ashley River / Rakahuri, a river in the Canterbury region of New Zealand
Ashley River, South Carolina, an unincorporated community in the United States
 Ashley River Historic District, Historic District in South Carolina, United States